Jim Warren may refer to:

Jim Warren (artist) (born 1949), American artist known for audio album and book cover artwork
Jim Warren (computer specialist) (1936–2021), mathematician and computer professional
Jim Warren (drag racer), American Top Fuel driver
Jim Warren (footballer) (1903–1977), Australian rules footballer
Jim Warren, founder of Family Tree DNA

See also
 James Warren (disambiguation)